The International Wheelchair and Amputee Sports Federation (IWAS) is an international sports organisation that governs sports for athletes with physical impairments.

IWAS is a registered charity with its headquarters located at Aylesbury College in Buckinghamshire. It is the international governing body for the Paralympic sport of wheelchair fencing as well as the developing sport of Power hockey. IWAS has over 60 member nations and it provides support for sporting opportunities across the world.

IWAS acts as a multi-sport competition organiser for the IWAS World Games and IWAS Under 23 World Games.

History
The International Stoke Mandeville Games were the forerunner of the Paralympic Games and followed the vision of their creator and founder, Sir Ludwig Guttmann.

 
IWAS was formed in 2005 following a merger of the International Stoke Mandeville Wheelchair Sports Federation (ISMWSF) (which was formerly known as the International Stoke Mandeville Games Federation (ISMGF)) and the International Sports Federation of the Disabled (ISOD). ISOD had been founded by the International War Veterans Association in 1964.

In 2021 IWAS's Wheelchair Fencing Athletes' Council identified international representatives for a new Gender Equity Commission.

Sports
Athletics

Fencing

IWAS World Games Programme 
The IWAS Games are held annually in different nations around the world and host they hundreds of athletes competing in a differing range of sports including Athletics, Swimming, Table Tennis, Wheelchair Fencing, Para Taekwondo and Archery. The Games offer the athletes of the 65+ IWAS Member Nations opportunities in the Paralympic movement.

IWAS Wheelchair Fencing World Championships
IWAS Wheelchair Fencing World Championships, Eger (HUN) 2015
IWAS World Championships, Budapest (HUN) 2013
IWAS World Championships, Catania 2011
IWAS World Championships, Paris 2010
IWAS World Championships, Budapest (HUN) 2006 Torino Italy

This bond has been strengthened by the opportunities presented by Organising Committees to create combined FIE/IWAS World Championship situations, such as the World Championships in Torino Italy (2006) and the forthcoming World Championships in Paris, France (2010)

U23 and U17 World Championships (NED)	7-11 October 2016
IWAS Under 23 Wheelchair Fencing World Championships, Sharjah (UAE)
IWAS Under 17 Wheelchair Fencing World Championships, Sharjah (UAE) 2015
IWAS Wheelchair Fencing U23 Championships, Warsaw (POL)

IWAS Wheelchair Fencing U17 Championships, Warsaw (POL)2014	
IWAS Wheelchair Fencing Junior Competitions (POL)2013

See also
 IWAS World Games

References

External links
 https://www.paralympic.org/news/fie-iwas-extend-agreement
 http://www.iwasf.com/iwasf/index.cfm/iwas-news1/results-summary-iwas-wheelchair-fencing-world-cup1/
 http://www.iwasf.com/iwasf/index.cfm/sports/iwas-wheelchair-fencing/
 http://www.iwasf.com/iwasf/index.cfm/sports/iwas-wheelchair-fencing/competitions1/
 http://www.iwasf.com/iwasf/index.cfm/sports/iwas-wheelchair-fencing/history1/
 

Parasports organizations
Amputee organizations
Paralympic Games
Wheelchair sports
Sport in Buckinghamshire
Charities based in Buckinghamshire
Sports organizations established in 2005
2005 establishments in the United Kingdom
International organisations based in the United Kingdom
International sports organizations